Renia fraternalis, the fraternal renia, is a litter moth of the family Erebidae. The species was first described by J. B. Smith in 1895. It is found in North America, including New York, Oklahoma, Arkansas, South Carolina and Florida.

The wingspan is about 25 mm.

External links

Lienk, S. E.; Chapman, P. J. & Webb, D. R. (1991). "Flight Period(s) of the Larger Species of Moths (Macrolepidoptera) That Occur in Western New York". New York's Food and Life Sciences Bulletin. (137) Archived March 4, 2012.

Herminiinae
Moths described in 1895